Charles Victor de Bonstetten (3 September 17453 February 1832) was a Swiss liberal writer.

Life
Charles Victor was born at Bern in Switzerland to one of its great patrician families on 3 September 1745. He began his education there before traveling at age 14 to Yverdon. He studied at Geneva from 1763 to 1766 at Geneva, where he came under the influence of Jean-Jacques Rousseau and Charles Bonnet and imbibed liberal sentiments. His father, intending to fit him for a career as a Bernese senator of the traditional type, was alarmed at the tone of his letters from Geneva and recalled his son to Bern. He obeyed but his distaste for Bernese life led him to attempt suicide by pistol. Supposedly, he was distracted by a moonbeam at the moment of discharge and survived to be sent by his father to Leiden to continue his studies.

As the climate of Leiden disagreed with him, he was permitted to travel to England in 1769, where he made many friends including the poet Thomas Gray. He returned home via Paris where he was introduced to its literary society. At home, he nursed his father during the illness which killed him in 1770. Following his father's death, he immediately traveled to Italy, where he reached as far south as Naples. No longer a revolutionary but still a liberal, he returned to Bern in 1774 and entered its political life.

He began his political career as a member of the avoyer's council and acted as the patron of the historian Johannes von Müller. He was soon appointed as bailiff over Gessenay, possibly leaving it in 1779 for Saanen. ambiguity He published his Pastoral Letters in German in 1781. In 1787, he was transferred to Nyon near the French border. He enjoyed the location but was distrusted both by his former liberal friends and his conservative peers. He was obliged to retire after taking part in a celebration of the storming of the Bastille in 1791 and—probably simply owing to his lack of military training—misdirecting the guards under his command when the area was threatened by the army of the Convention the next year. From 1795 to 1797, he served as bailiff of the Italian-speaking districts of Lugano, Locarno, Mendrisio, and Val Maggia in the Ticino valley. He is credited with introducing the region to the potato.

The French invasion of Switzerland and establishment of the Helvetic Republic in 1798 drove Bonstetten once more into private life. At the invitation of Madame Brun, he resided in Copenhagen, Denmark, until 1801. He then traveled to Italy before settling in Geneva for the remainder of his life. He resided there uneventfully but in the society of many distinguished people, including Madame de Staël. His most celebrated book—Men of the South and of the North—was published during this era, arguing that climate was responsible for the superiority of northern Europe over the south, but his own writing generally fell into low esteem. Instead, he is principally remembered for his social character—as a conversationalist, and as the friend, often the intimate companion of many of the more celebrated leaders of thought and action during his long life.

Works
 , 1782
 The Hermit (1792)
 Lesser Writings (1799–1801)
 On National Education (1802)
 Trip to the Scene of the Last 6 Books of the Aeneid, with Some Observations on Modern Latium (1805)
 Research on the Nature and Laws of the Imagination (1807)
 Thoughts on the Diverse Objects of Public Goods (1815)
 Studies on Man, or, Research on the Faculties of Thought and Thinking (1821)
 Man of the South and Man of the North, or, The Influence of Climates (1824)
 Scandinavia and the Alps (1826)
 Recollections Written in 1831 (1831)

See also
 Switzerland in the Napoleonic era
 Swiss literature

Notes

References
 
 

1745 births
1832 deaths
18th-century writers from the Republic of Geneva
Coppet group
Writers from Bern
Swiss non-fiction writers
Conversationalists